Stefany Hernández (born 13 June 1991 at Ciudad Guayana, Venezuela) is a Venezuelan racing cyclist who represents Venezuela in BMX. She represented Venezuela at the 2012 Summer Olympics in the women's BMX event. She was fifth in her semifinal heat and not succeed to qualify into the final. Her final standing was ninth. She became BMX World Champion on 25 July 2015 at Zolder, Belgium.

She competed at the 2016 Summer Olympic in Rio de Janeiro in the women's BMX event. She won the bronze medal with a time of 34.755. She was the flag bearer for Venezuela during the closing ceremony.

References

External links
 
 
 
 
 

1991 births
Living people
Venezuelan female cyclists
Olympic cyclists of Venezuela
Olympic medalists in cycling
Olympic bronze medalists for Venezuela
Cyclists at the 2012 Summer Olympics
Cyclists at the 2016 Summer Olympics
Medalists at the 2016 Summer Olympics
Pan American Games medalists in cycling
Pan American Games bronze medalists for Venezuela
Cyclists at the 2015 Pan American Games
Cyclists at the 2019 Pan American Games
Medalists at the 2019 Pan American Games
Central American and Caribbean Games medalists in cycling
Central American and Caribbean Games silver medalists for Venezuela
Competitors at the 2010 Central American and Caribbean Games
Competitors at the 2014 Central American and Caribbean Games
South American Games medalists in cycling
South American Games silver medalists for Venezuela
South American Games bronze medalists for Venezuela
Competitors at the 2010 South American Games
Competitors at the 2014 South American Games
People from Bolívar (state)
21st-century Venezuelan women